Madman (Philip Sterns) is a fictional supervillain appearing in American comic books published by Marvel Comics. The character is portrayed as one of the Hulk's enemies and as the brother of the Leader.

Publication history
He first appeared as Philip Sterns in The Incredible Hulk vol. 2 #362 and as the Madman in The Incredible Hulk vol. 2 #364 where they were created by Peter David and Jeff Purves.

Fictional character biography
A former classmate of Bruce Banner's in graduate school at the California Institute of Technology (Caltech), Sterns possesses a love/hate obsession with Banner's "career" as the Hulk, originating from his envy and fascination with his former peer. He subjected numerous experiments on himself, involving gamma rays to emulate his "hero." This results in transforming him into a distorted monster with abnormal strength and developing multiple personality disorder. From this point, a much more powerful, arguably deranged, personality gives him ‘orders’ to carry out.

Calling himself the Madman, Sterns hatches a plot to kill the Hulk by giving him a poison injection that rapidly deteriorates his physique. This puts him in conflict with various members of his rogues’ gallery, most notably the Abomination, turning weaker and more emaciated for every battle. Samuel Sterns, the Leader and Phil's brother, comes to aid the Hulk so he can help him track down the Madman for an antidote. He explains that the Madman "frightens" him, but cannot force himself to kill his own brother. During the ensuing battle, the Madman suffers from a psychological breakdown, completely submerging his original personality. The Hulk manages to cure himself, as well as poisoning the Madman, leaving the latter on his death bed with the remedy dropped barely out of reach.

Later, the Madman revealed that he simply increased his mass to grab it and recovered in time. He masquerades as a researcher in the Red Skull's "New World Order" organization. Here, he helped to engineer the transformation of a captured S.H.I.E.L.D. agent into the power-mimicking creature known as Piecemeal, and installed a safety override, making it answerable only to himself.

When tracking the creature, he finds it in confrontation with the Hulk in the vicinity of Loch Ness, and knocks out his enemy from behind. He dumps the Hulk into the lake saddled with iron weights, but is disappointed when the latter takes longer than expected to escape. During the ensuing gang-up, the Madman continues to make disorderly, deranged remarks. When Perseus, a retired Pantheon member the Hulk was visiting, tries to intervene, the Madman indifferently kills him, but the Hulk punches him away.

While the Hulk seemingly kills Piecemeal, the Madman decides to take off in a stolen jet. The Hulk overtakes and starts to dismantle the jet, and the Madman triggers a pilot-chair parachute, remarking that he is not interested in killing the Hulk, since it would be dull to not annoy him anymore, and detonates the plane.

After landing in London, where the two superhumans called Killpower and Motormouth happen to be staying, he immediately holds the British Prince Charles hostage on top of Buckingham Palace, and demands to be declared king of England. As the Hulk comes to the rescue, the Madman states that the latter should understand the demands to use great power and shifts from crying to irreverently upbeat within seconds, dropping the Prince towards the ground. The Hulk catches up to him, while the Madman, after being knocked back by Motormouth, is in the middle of a temper tantrum about everybody "ganging up on him", and manages to knock him down. The Madman once again voices his "love"/admiration for the Hulk/Banner, but takes the opportunity to escape as the Tower Bridge collapses underneath them.

As part of the Marvel NOW! event, the Madman resurfaces and has been seen supplying gamma technology on the island of Kata Jaya. He runs afoul of the Red Hulk's incarnation of the Thunderbolts. The Madman was killed by the Leader in his Red Leader form when he whispered something in his ear.

After taking over Kata Jaya, the Leader makes a deal with Mephisto that allows him to observe the Madman being tortured in Hell. When Mephisto later takes the Leader to Hell, he notes that they need to "get his brother over here with some razor blades".

Powers and abilities
Like the Hulk, the Madman has immense strength and durability. He once knocked out the Hulk with a single punch to the head through his advantage of surprise. Unlike the Hulk, however, he is unable to grow stronger while becoming angrier, but capable of creating significant boosts in his size, density, and power, making him greatly exceed the Grey Hulk's "calm strength level" for brief periods. The Madman can even assume many different forms, including a scientist spying on the New World Order. He is also a gifted genius, with knowledge in nuclear physics and robotics.

In other media

Television
 The Madman appears in The Avengers: Earth's Mightiest Heroes episode "Hulk vs. the World" as an inmate in the Cube, a prison for gamma-powered villains.

Video games
 The Madman appears as one of the major bosses in the Hulk video game voiced by Paul Dobson. He works with his brother, the Leader, to create a world ruled by gamma creatures (Freehold). The Madman first appears kidnapping Betty Ross, and putting her in a gamma chamber. The Hulk comes to rescue Betty and battle him. He returns near the end of the game, in the Leader's base, and teams up with Halflife to kill Bruce Banner. However, Banner turns into the Hulk, and battles the duo. The Madman flees in the middle of the boss fight, leaving Halflife at the mercy of the Hulk. When the base is collapsing, he tries to battle the Hulk one more time. He is presumably killed in the final fight after the Leader's base was destroyed as he was left behind.

References

External links
 Madman at Marvel.com

Characters created by Peter David
Comics characters introduced in 1989
Fictional characters who can change size
Fictional characters with density control abilities
Fictional characters with dissociative identity disorder
Fictional characters with superhuman durability or invulnerability
Fictional nuclear physicists
Fictional roboticists
Marvel Comics characters who are shapeshifters
Marvel Comics characters with superhuman strength
Marvel Comics male supervillains
Marvel Comics mutates
Marvel Comics scientists
Fictional California Institute of Technology people